Terbequinil (SR-25776) is a stimulant and nootropic drug which acts as a partial inverse agonist at benzodiazepine sites on the GABAA receptor. In human trials it was found to partially reverse the sedative and amnestic effects of the hypnotic drug triazolam with only slight effects when administered by itself.

See also
 GABAA receptor negative allosteric modulator
 GABAA receptor § Ligands

References

2-Quinolones
Ethers
Carboxamides
GABAA receptor negative allosteric modulators